The People's Assembly is Syria's legislative authority. It has 250 members elected for a four-year term in 15 multi-seat constituencies. There are two main political fronts; the National Progressive Front and Popular Front for Change and Liberation. The 2012 elections, held on 7 May, resulted in a new parliament that, for the first time in four decades, is based on a multi-party system. In 1938, Fares Al-Khoury became the first Christian to be elected Speaker.
In 2016 Hadiya Khalaf Abbas, Ph.D., representing Deir Ezzor since 2003, became the first woman elected to be the Speaker. In 2017, Hammouda Sabbagh became the first Syriac Orthodox Christian to have held the post.

The assembly meets at least three times a year and in special occasions called by the council's president or the president of the country.

Latest elections
The last elections were held on the 19 July 2020. Several lists were allowed to run across the country but any real opposition is absent. Millions of Syrians living abroad, after fleeing a war that has killed more than 380,000 people, are not eligible to vote.

The National Progressive Front won 183 out of 250 seats, 167 of which were for the Baʻth Party, while 67 Independents held the rest of the seats.

|-
!style="background-color:#E9E9E9" align=left valign=top|Parties
!style="background-color:#E9E9E9" align=right |Seats
!style="background-color:#E9E9E9" align=right |Seats Inside
|-
|align=left valign=top|National Progressive Front
|align=center rowspan=10|183
|align=center| 183
|-
|align=left|
Arab Socialist Baʻth Party
|align=center| 167
|-
|align=left|
 Syrian Social Nationalist Party
|align=center| 3
|-
|align=left|
 Arab Socialist Union
|align=center| 3
|-
|align=left|
Communist Party of Syria (Wissal Farha Bakdash faction)
|align=center| 2
|-
|align=left|
Socialist Unionists
|align=center| 2
|-
|align=left|
Communist Party of Syria (Yusuf Faisal faction)
|align=center| 2
|-
|align=left|
 National Vow Movement
|align=center| 2
|-
|align=left|
 Arabic Democratic Union Party
|align=center| 1
|-
|align=left|
 Democratic Socialist Unionist Party
|align=center| 1
|-
|align=left valign=top|Popular Front for Change and Liberation
|align=center rowspan=2| 0
|align=center| 0
|-
|align=left|
 People's Will Party
|align=center| 0
|-
|align=left valign=top|Non-partisans (Independent)  
|align=center| 67
|rowspan=2 style="background-color:#E9E9E9"|
|-
|align=left style="background-color:#E9E9E9"|Total
|width="30" align="right" style="background-color:#E9E9E9"|250
|-
|colspan=5 align=left|Source: Election results
|}

Names of legislature
The name of the legislature in Syria has changed, as follows, as has the composition and functions:
 Under the Occupied Enemy Territory Administration (1917–1920)
 Syrian National Congress (1919–1920)
 Arab Kingdom of Syria (1920)
 Syrian National Congress (1920)
 State of Syria, part of the French Mandate (1922–1930)
 Constituent Council (1923–1925)
 Constituent Assembly (1924–1930)
 Syrian Republic (1930–58)
 Council of Representatives (1932–1933)
 Chamber of Deputies (1932–1946)
 House of Representatives (1947–1949)
 Constituent Assembly (1949–1951)
 Chamber of Deputies (1953–1958)
 United Arab Republic (1958–1961)
 Chamber of Deputies (1958–1960)
 Syrian Arab Republic (1961–present)
 Chamber of Deputies (1961–1963)
 National Revolutionary Council (1965–1966)
 People's Assembly (1971–present)

See also
 Speaker of the People's Council of Syria
 Politics of Syria
 List of legislatures by country

References

External links
People's Assembly of Syria official government website

 
Syria
Government of Syria
Syria
Syria